Bruce Lee: Quest of the Dragon is a beat 'em up video game featuring martial artist Bruce Lee. It was developed by Ronin Entertainment and published by Universal Interactive, and was released in Europe and the United States for the Xbox in 2002 to a negative critical reception.

Gameplay
Bruce Lee: Quest of the Dragon is a pure beat 'em up, using a 3D graphics engine and consisting of normal section where the player is brawling against multiple common enemies, and of one-on-one boss fights. New Jeet Kune Do-style moves can be purchased for the coins gained by beating up enemies.

Plot
The game features a story line in which 24-year-old Bruce battles multiple enemies to rescue his kidnapped father and retrieve the mystical Golden Relic from an organized crime organization known as Black Lotus, led by mysterious "Dragon Lady", whose father Chai Wan was inadvertently killed by Lee. Players control Lee through a series of areas set in various locations around the world, including Hong Kong, London and San Francisco. The game's bosses include Dragon Lady's sisters, including Cleopatra and Rhianna, and her other followers, such as Cobra and female ninja assassin Tsuki.

Development
On May 17, 2001, Microsoft announced an exclusive partnership with Universal Interactive to publish Bruce Lee games for the Xbox.

Reception
The game was highly anticipated, but was panned by critics. It has an aggregate rating of 35.51% on GameRankings. It was a runner-up for GameSpots annual "Most Disappointing Game on Xbox" and overall "Worst Game of the Year on Xbox" awards. The most often cited complaints were about inadequate controls and combat lock-on system, low-quality graphics, frequent loading times, bad plot and voice acting, and the lack of any in-game tutorials. IGN regarded Quest of the Dragon as vastly inferior to the Game Boy Advance game Bruce Lee: Return of the Legend.<ref>[http://www.ign.com/articles/2003/05/31/bruce-lee-return-of-the-legend IGN: Bruce Lee: Return of the Legend Review]. IGN. Retrieved on 2009-10-04</ref> In 2011, UGO.com included it in their list of 102 worst video games ever created, calling it "as close to blasphemy as the fighting genre gets."

See alsoDragon: The Bruce Lee StoryJackie Chan StuntmasterJet Li: Rise to HonorStranglehold'', starring Chow Yun-fat

References

External links

2002 video games
3D beat 'em ups
Bruce Lee video games
Single-player video games
Universal Interactive games
Video games developed in the United States
Video games set in 1964
Video games set in China
Video games set in Hong Kong
Video games set in San Francisco
Video games set in London
Xbox-only games
Xbox games
Ronin Entertainment games